Hana Purkrábková (19 August 1936, Tábor - 14 January 2019, Prague) was a Czech ceramist and sculptor.

Biography 
After finishing primary school in Tábor, she studied at the Secondary Industrial Ceramic School in Bechyně from 1951 to 1955. The school under the guidance of chemist Ing. Petrů had an excellent teaching staff at that time (the head of the art department was academic sculptor Prof. Bohumil Dobiáš) and was characterized by a liberal atmosphere. From there she was accepted to the Academy of Arts, Architecture and Design in Prague to the studio of professor Jan Kavan, where she met Karel Pauzer.

After graduating in 1961, she was employed in the ceramics workshop of the Central Office of Arts and Crafts in Štěchovice (formerly the David family's business), and until 1969 she also carried out her free work there.

In 1962-1969 she took part in several exhibitions of young artists in Prague, the International Ceramic Symposium at the Václav Špála Gallery, an exhibition in Amsterdam and the important New Figuration exhibition at Mánes Gallery in Prague.

From 1969 onwards, she worked only freely in the studio she and Karel Pauzer built together in Brunšov. After the Warsaw Pact invasion of Czechoslovakia, and the following period of "normalization", she exhibited mostly ceramics and occasionally sculptures at joint exhibitions. Her first solo exhibition (together with V. Boudníková) took place in 1977 in Týn nad Vltavou, while a solo exhibition with Karel Pauzer took place in 1988, in Atrium Gallery in Prague. She participated in unofficial exhibitions in the 1980s and contributed to the anthology "Grey Brick" published by the Jazz Section in 1985. In 1986 she received a gold medal at the International Ceramics Exhibition in Gualdo Tadino, Italy. Since 1992 she has been a member of the renewed Umělecká beseda arts association and of the Association of Ceramic Artists. She lived and worked in Brunšov.

Awards 
 1962 Honorable mention at the International Ceramics Exhibition in Prague
 1986 Gold medal, International Ceramics Exhibition in Gualdo Tadino, Italy

Work 
She creates her works almost exclusively in ceramic and fire clay, keeping the colour of the material and the raw surface or finishing them with patina and fine polychromy.

Her lifelong theme is the figure, the psychology of human expressions and situations. At the beginning, when she created chamber sculptures in parallel with utilitarian ceramics spun on the potter's wheel, she loosely followed the legacy of the previous generation of sculptors in terms of modelling, colour and civil matter-of-factness, but in terms of expression, stylisation and conception she already co-created the aesthetics of the New figuration.

The artist does not depict faces, but human types; she is not interested in specific features, but in generalizing parables of human smallness, imperfection and minor vices. She catches people in banal or embarrassing situations, sometimes with sympathy and understanding (a group of seated ladies), sometimes with irony and exaggeration (eaters, sloths and dreamers).

However, the author is completely merciless in her expressive or grotesque portrayal of various heads, loudmouths and observers, whose human smallness is evident despite their horrible gesticulation. Their counterparts are the passive-looking half-figures of citizens or sleepers.

The world of humans and animals, at the beginning of the work depicted in general situations and relationships (Friendly Dog, Master and Dog), eventually merges and fuses into the chimera of an animal with a human face - an unkind symbol of the Candidate of our time.

Gallery

Representation in collections 
 Clay Studio, Philadelphia
 Gualdo Tadino Gallery
 National Gallery in Prague
 Moravian Gallery in Brno
 Museum of Decorative Arts in Prague
 Municipal Gallery in Brno
 Alš South Bohemian Gallery in Hluboká nad Vltavou
 Gallery of Fine Arts in Cheb
 North Bohemian Gallery of Fine Arts in Litoměřice
 Ceramic Collection in Bechyně
 Gallery of Modern Art in Roudnice nad Labem
 City Museum and Gallery in Hranice
 Horácké Museum in Nové Město na Moravě

Selected exhibitions

Author´s exhibitions 
 1977 Hana Purkrábková, Týn nad Vltavou Museum (with Vera Boudníková)
 1983 Hana Purkrábková: Ceramic sculpture, Museum Bechyně
 1988 Hana Purkrábková: Sculptures, Karel Pauzer: Drawings, Sculptures, Atrium Gallery, Prague
 1992 Hana Purkrábková: Sculptures, Litera Gallery, Prague
 1993 Hana Purkrábková: Sculptures, Aleš South Bohemian Gallery in Bechyně
 1998 Hana Purkrábková: Sleepers and Others, Rich Art Gallery, Chrudim
 2002 Hana Purkrábková: Sculture e disegni, Art...on paper, Lugano, Italy
 2004 Karel Pauzer: A little bit of natural history, Hana Purkrábková: Selected Society, North Bohemian Gallery of Fine Arts in Litoměřice
 2005 Hana Purkrábková: Selected Society, Art Gallery Karlovy Vary, Aleš South Bohemian Gallery in Bechyně
 2005 Hana Purkrábková: Small Society, Art Gallery, Chrudim
 2006 Hana Purkrábková: It Doesn't Get Any Better, Navrátil Gallery, Prague
 2011 Hana Purkrábková: Half-Losses, Art Gallery, Chrudim
 2011/12 Hana Purkrábková: Temporary stay, Navrátil Gallery, Prague
 2012 Hana Purkrábková: Selected Society, Gallery of Fine Arts in Havlíčkův Brod
 2016 Hana Purkrábková, Karel Pauzer / Seeing Life, Gallery at the White Unicorn, Klatovy
 2017 Karel Pauzer / Hana Purkrábková: Creatures, Gallery of Modern Art, Roudnice nad Labem

Joint exhibitions 
 1962 World Ceramics Exhibition, Prague
 1966 Exhibition of the Young / Exposition des jeunes, House of the Lords of Kunštát, Brno
 1967 Exhibition of the Young ´67, Exhibition Hall of the Institute of Arts, Prague
 1968 Youth Exhibition ´68, Exhibition Hall of the Institute of Art and Design, Prague
 1968 Intersymposium Czechoslovakia - Ceramics Bechyně 68, Václav Špála Gallery, Prague
 1969 New Figuration, Mánes Gallery, Prague
 1969 Zestien Tsjechische kunstenaars. Dertien grafici en drie keramisten, Galerie de Tor, Amsterdam
 1970 Contemporary Czechoslovak Art, Piran, Zagreb, Ljubljana
 1976 The Image of Man in Ceramics, Moravian Gallery in Brno
 1984 Moderne Keramik Tschechoslowakischer Künstler, Keramion, Museum für zeitgenössische keramische Kunst, Frechen
 1987 Ceramic Sculpture from Czechoslovakia, Lee Sclar Gallery, Morristown
 1988 International Ceramics Exhibition in Gualdo Tadino, Italy
 1988 Ceramics 88, Palace of Culture, Prague
 1989 Smile, Joke and Grin, Palace of Culture, Prague
 1991 Tschechische Keramik, Hetjens-Museum/Deutsches Keramikmuseum, Düsseldorf
 1992 Contemporary East European Ceramics, The Clay Studio, Philadelphia
 1992 Acquisitions of 20th Century Czech Art 1989-1992, Prague Castle Riding Hall, Prague
 1992 Kunstmarkt '92, Galerie Brigitte Knyrim, Regensburg
 1993/94 New Figuration, North Bohemian Gallery of Fine Arts in Litoměřice, East Bohemian Gallery in Pardubice, Moravian Gallery in Brno, House of Art in Opava, Regional Gallery of Highlands in Jihlava
 1994 Fünf tschechische Keramiker, Galerie L, Hamburg
 1995/96 Tschechische Keramik, Ehemalige Synagoge, Sandhausen, Galerie für Englische Keramik Sandhausen
 1996/97 Umění zastaveného čas / Art when time stood still, Czech Art Scene 1969-1985, Prague, Brno, Cheb
 1998 Die Menschliche Figur / The Human Figure - Eine Ausstellung in Zwei Teilen / An Exhibition in Two Parts, Kunstforum Kirchberg
 1999 The Art of Accelerated Time. Czech Art Scene 1958 - 1968, Prague, Cheb
 2000 	Material: Erde, Grösse: Klein (Keramische Plastik)/Material: Earth, Size: Small (Ceramic Sculpture), Kunstforum Kirchberg
 2001 ...about people..., Czech Museum of Fine Arts, Bayer & Bayer Gallery, Prague
 2001 Coloured Sculpture, North Bohemian Gallery of Fine Arts in Litoměřice
 2005 Osteuropäische Keramik - Geforme Erde, Oberpfälzer Künstlerhaus, Schwandorf
 2006 Czech Art of the 20th Century 1940 - 1970, Aleš South Bohemian Gallery in Hluboká nad Vltavou
 2010 Crazy Colorful World, Millennium Gallery, Prague
 2012 Summer Ceramic Sculpture, Klenová
 2014 Phenomenon B, International Museum of Ceramics AJG, Bechyně
 2015 Summer Ceramic Sculpture, Roztoky Museum
 2016 Summer Ceramic Sculpture, Roztoky Museum
 2017 Summer Ceramic Sculpture, Roztoky Museum
 2018 Summer ceramic sculpture, Roztoky Museum
 2019 Contact: International Symposium of Ceramics Bechyně 1966-2018, Kvalitář Gallery, Prague

References

Sources

Books 
 Contemporary Ceramics, Růžička M, Vlček T, 1979, Odeon (71 p.)
 Durdisová S et al., translation Steven Conway, Art in Investment and Postal Bank, 305 p., Prague 1998
 New Encyclopaedia of Czech Fine Arts , Horová A et al, 1995, Academia, ISBN 80-200-0522-6
 Dictionary of Czech and Slovak visual artists 1950 - 2003, Chagall Art Centre, Ostrava 2003, ISBN 80-86171-17-5

Catalogues 
 Hana Purkrábková, Jan Kříž, cat. 20 p., Gallery of Fine Arts in Cheb 1985
 Hana Purkrábková, 1991, cat. 4 p., ČFVU Prague
 Hana Purkrábková: Ceramic Sculpture, 1992, Růžička Milouš, cat. 8 p., Aleš South Bohemian Gallery in Hluboká nad Vltavou
 Hana Purkrábková: Sculptures, 1992, Neumannová Švaňková Eva, cat. 4+1 p., Litera Gallery, Prague
 Hana Purkrábková. Karel Pauzer, Moravian Gallery in Brno 1993
 Hana Purkrábková: Sleepers and Others, 1998, Novotná Jarmila, cat. 4 p., Rich Art Gallery, Chrudim
 Hana Purkrábková - Selected Company, Karel Pauzer - A Little bit of Natural History, 2004, Milena Klasová, Eva Petrová and Kristián Suda, North Bohemian Gallery of Fine Arts in Litoměřice
 Hana Purkrábková, 2005, Galerie Magna Ostrava
 Hana Purkrábková, Karel Pauzer: Beings, A. Potůčková, cat. 54 p., Gallery of Modern Art in Roudnice nad Labem 2017

External links 

 List of works in the Complete Catalogue of the Czech Republic, whose author or subject is Hana Purkrábková
 Hana Purkrábková in the abART information system
 Artistic confessions: Hana Purkrábková, Czech TV, 2014
 Sculptures by Hana Purkrábková in Navrátil Gallery, Czech Radio Vltava, 2011
 Brunšov Newsletter, 2009, p.8-9
 Gallery Art: Hana Purkrábková

Czech sculptors
20th-century Czech women artists
Czech women ceramists
Academy of Arts, Architecture and Design in Prague alumni